Educating Peter is a 1992 American short documentary film directed by Gerardine Wurzburg about Peter Gwazdauskas, a special needs student with Down syndrome, and his inclusion in a standard third grade classroom in Blacksburg, Virginia. It won an Oscar at the 65th Academy Awards in 1993 for Documentary Short Subject.

Cast
 Judy Gwazdauskas as Herself (Peter's Mother)
 Frank Gwazdauskas as Himself (Peter's Father)
 Peter Gwazdauskas as Himself
 Mrs. Stallings (Peter's Teacher) and her class.
 Mrs. Colley (Special Education Teacher)

Plot
Peter Gwazdauskas, a third-grade boy with Down Syndrome is beginning traditional school with regularly developing students for the first time. Originally, he was in a school only with other students with autism and special needs.  Peter was enrolled in a traditional school because federal law states that students with special needs should be educated with regularly developing students in traditional schools. Peter's first half of the school year was not going well because he was exhibiting behaviors such as making loud noises, rolling around on the floor, and being injurious towards other students in class. But when it was the middle of the year in January, things started to improve much better for Peter and he did just fine towards the end of the school year. Because of his improvements throughout the year, Peter received an award for being an exceptional student on the last day of school along with his other classmates.

Sequel
Graduating Peter was released in 2001. The sequel follows Peter in middle school, high school, and his high school graduation.

References

External links

Educating Peter at Direct Cinema Limited

1992 films
1992 documentary films
1992 independent films
1992 short films
American independent films
American short documentary films
Best Documentary Short Subject Academy Award winners
Documentary films about children with disability
Documentary films about Down syndrome
Documentary films about special education
Blacksburg, Virginia
Education in Montgomery County, Virginia
1990s English-language films
1990s American films